Sibon longifrenis is a species of snake in the family Colubridae. It is found in Panama, Costa Rica, Honduras and Nicaragua.

References 

Reptiles described in 1909
Snakes of Central America
Reptiles of Panama
Reptiles of Costa Rica
Reptiles of Honduras
Reptiles of Nicaragua
Colubrids
Taxa named by Leonhard Stejneger